Alagapuri  is a village in the Udayarpalayam taluk of Ariyalur district, Tamil Nadu, India. It is also Known as alagapuram

Demographics 

As per the 2001 census, Alagapuri had a total population of 5105 with 2539 males and 2566 females.

References 

Villages in Ariyalur district